Westward the Women is a 1951 Western film directed by William A. Wellman and starring Robert Taylor, Denise Darcel and John McIntire.

Plot
In 1851, Roy Whitman wants to keep the lonely men who live in Whitman's Valley from leaving, so he decides to bring respectable women west to California to marry them. Roy hires experienced though skeptical wagon master Buck Wyatt to lead a wagon train along the California Trail. In Chicago, Roy recruits 138 "good women", despite Buck telling them that a third will not survive the journey. The women range from Patience, an older widow from New Bedford, to Rose Meyers, a pregnant, unmarried woman seeking a better future. The women choose prospective mates from daguerreotype pictures tacked to a display board. Two showgirls, Fifi Danon and Laurie Smith, hastily change their flashy clothing when others like them are rejected before presenting themselves to Roy and Buck. Whitman is not fooled, but is convinced they wish to reform. He accepts them, bringing the total count to 140 women.

Roy and Buck take the women to St. Joseph, Missouri, where Conestoga wagons, horses, and mules await, along with 15 trail hands hired by Buck. Ito, a determined if diminutive Japanese man, persuades Buck to take him on as the cook. Before setting out, Buck warns the men and the women to stay away from each other, as he has seen wagon trains torn apart by romantic shenanigans. Four experienced women teach the others how to harness draft animals and drive the wagons. After a week's training, the train heads west.

During the journey, Buck executes a man who raped Laurie. As a result, all but two trail hands desert during the night, with eight women going with them. This leaves only Buck, Roy, Ito, and Sid Cutler, who has fallen in love with Rose. Roy decides they must turn back, but as they are half-way to their destination, Buck believes the women can "do a man's job" and finish the difficult journey. He trains them how to shoot to defend themselves. Young Tony Moroni, the only boy on the train, is accidentally killed during firearms practice. When his distraught widowed mother (who only speaks Italian) refuses to leave her son's grave, Buck knocks her out, hogties her, and puts her in Patience and Rose's wagon lest she commit suicide out of grief. The journey continues.

The women persevere through hardships and dangers, including a stampede and a dangerous descent down a steep, rocky trail that kills one woman. An Indian attack claims the lives of Roy, Sid, and six women. When a rainstorm undercuts the river bank, Fifi and Laurie's wagon plunges into the water, drowning Laurie. Gradually, Fifi begins to thaw Buck's attitude towards women in general and her in particular. She and Buck fall in love.

On the edge of the desert, Buck orders the wagons to be lightened, leaving furniture and fancy clothing behind. As they proceed across the sand, Rose goes into labor and delivers a boy.

Near the end of their string after crossing the desert, they reach a small lake on the border of Whitman's Valley. The women refuse to go any further until Buck brings them decent apparel so they will look presentable to their future husbands. Buck rides on ahead and tells the men to find any material they can from which the women can make new clothes.

Back in proper dresses, the ladies drive into town. Patience warns that the women will be doing the choosing as they pair off with the men whose pictures they already picked. Mrs. Moroni meets and pairs up with an Italian citrus farmer, and one man willingly accepts Rose and her baby. As the men and women dance, some couples get into line to be married by a preacher. Ito coaxes Fifi into swallowing her pride and going to Buck, who pretends he is preparing to ride out. They join the line waiting for the minister as Ito watches the proceedings.

Cast
 Robert Taylor as Buck Wyatt
 Denise Darcel as Fifi Danon
 John McIntire as Roy E. Whitman
 Hope Emerson as Patience Hawley
 Julie Bishop as Laurie Smith
 Lenore Lonergan as Maggie O'Malley
 Henry Nakamura as Ito Yoshisuke Takeyoshi Gennosuke Kentaro
 Marilyn Erskine as Jean Johnson
 Beverly Dennis as Rose Meyers
 Renata Vanni as Mrs. Moroni
 Pat Conway as Sid Cutler (uncredited)
 Guido Martufi it as Antonio Moroni (uncredited)

Production
Frank Capra, who receives story credit, originally intended to do this film himself; he'd always wanted to make a western, hopefully with Gary Cooper, but Paramount wasn't interested. He mentioned the idea to Wellman, who asked if he could take a stab at it. Capra gave him his blessing, and Wellman pitched it to Dore Schary at MGM, who liked the concept and gave him the go-ahead.

A documentary included in the film's DVD states that it was filmed at various locations in Kane County, Utah. Film locations also include Johnson Canyon, the Gap, Paria, and Surprise Valley in Utah. The documentary also mentions that the actresses all had to learn how to drive a four horse team pulling a wagon.

Reception
According to MGM records the film earned $2,640,000 in the US and Canada and $1,356,000 elsewhere, resulting in a profit of $266,000.

Radio adaptation
Westward the Women was presented on Lux Radio Theatre December 29, 1952. Taylor and Darcel re-created their roles from the film in the one-hour adaptation.

Caravans of women
In 1985, the Spanish village of Plan, Aragon, made Spanish news when local bachelors organized a "caravan of women" after Westward the Women was aired on TV. At the time the plan was conceived, there were over 40 single men and just one single woman in the town, since most of the local women had emigrated. An advertisement in the press calling for "Women between 20 and 40 with marriage intentions for Pyrenees village" resulted in 33 marriages, revitalizing Plan.

Since then, other Spanish villages have organized similar "caravans".

References

External links

 
 
 
 

Films directed by William A. Wellman
1951 films
1951 Western (genre) films
American Western (genre) films
Metro-Goldwyn-Mayer films
Films set in 1851
Films shot in Utah
American black-and-white films
1950s English-language films
1950s American films